The tennis tournaments at the 2024 Summer Olympics in Paris are scheduled to run from 27 July to 4 August at the iconic Stade Roland Garros, featuring a total of 172 players across five medal events: singles and doubles for both men and women and mixed doubles. 

Similar to the previous editions, the Paris 2024 format is set in a single-elimination tournament with the men's and women's singles draws consisting of 64 players. The tennis tournaments will feature six rounds in the men's and women's singles, five in the men's and women's doubles (draw size of 32), and four in the mixed doubles (draw size of 16). The players and pairs advancing to the semifinal stage will guarantee their medal contention with the two losing semifinalists competing for a bronze medal. Since Tokyo 2020, all singles matches will remain the best of three sets with a standard tiebreak (first to seven points) in every set, including the final set. In all doubles competitions, a match tiebreak (first to ten points) will be contested instead of a third set.

For the first time since Barcelona 1992, all tennis matches will be staged in the clay courts contrary to the hard DecoTurf surface used in the previous edition.

Qualification

To be eligible for Paris 2024, a tennis player must satisfy the key criteria to play on Davis Cup or Billie Jean King Cup teams. The qualification pathway for the singles tournaments is primarily based on the ITF world rankings of June 12, 2024, with 56 players entering each of the men's and women's singles (limited to four per National Olympic Committee (NOC)). Six of the remaining eight slots are attributed to the NOCs with no other qualified tennis players across five continental zones (two for the Americas and one each for the rest). The final two spots are reserved, one for the host nation France and the other for the previous Olympic gold medalist or Grand Slam champion.  In the men's and women's doubles tournaments, thirty-two places will offer for the highest-ranked teams with ten of them reserved for players in the top ten of the doubles rankings, who could select his or her partner from their NOC ranked in the top 300 of either singles or doubles. The remaining spots are attributed through the combined rankings with a preference given to the singles players once the total quota is filled. One team per gender is reserved for the host nation France if none has already become eligible otherwise. With no quota places available for the mixed doubles, all teams will consist of players already entered in either the singles or doubles, including the top 15 combined ranking teams and the host nation France.

Competition schedule

Medal summary

Medal table

Medalists

See also
Tennis at the 2022 Asian Games
Tennis at the 2023 Pan American Games

References 

 
2024
2024 Summer Olympics events
Olympics
Tennis tournaments in France
2024 in French tennis